John Davies Enys (11 October 1837 – 7 November 1912) was a New Zealand runholder and naturalist. He was born in Penryn, Cornwall, England to John Samuel Enys (1796 – 1872) and Catherine (née Gilbert).

He was educated at Harrow School, and went to New Zealand in 1861 with John Acland.

See also

 Enys family of Enys in Cornwall

References

1837 births
1912 deaths
New Zealand farmers
New Zealand conservationists
People from Penryn, Cornwall
British emigrants to New Zealand
New Zealand people of Cornish descent
Farmers from Cornwall
New Zealand naturalists